Idrottsföreningen Elfsborg, more commonly known as IF Elfsborg or simply Elfsborg, is a professional football club based in Borås, Sweden, and is affiliated to the Västergötlands Fotbollförbund. They play in the Allsvenskan and have spent most of their history in the top tier of Swedish football. Their homeground is Borås Arena, where they have played since 17 April 2005.

The club was founded in 1904 by a group of 19 youngsters which all were 14–15 years old. Borås Fotbollslag was formed in Ordenshuset at Landala (today Knalleland) on 26 June 1904. The main protagonist in the formation, Carl Larson, who in addition to football also practiced athletics and wrestling. Claimed the reason was that the main sports club in the city, Borås Athletic and Sports Society, would not exert football in their program.

Carl Larson, however, found that there were too many clubs containing the city name Borås which contributed to the name change in 1906 by Riksidrottsförbundet to the current, IF Elfsborg. The name is derived from Älvsborg County where instead of making use of the modern spelling Älvsborg, they used out of the older spelling with an E. The same goes for the club colours, reflected in their crest and kit, yellow and black. Colors that are taken from Älvsborg Regiment, Elfsborg would not only represent a city but a whole region. A recurring motto of the club is "Vi Tillsammans" (We together).

The club's homeground Borås Arena is also called Elfsborg Fortress, since Elfsborg is Allsvenskan home strongest team in the 2000s (decade). It is one of two teams in Allsvenskan that has won against the Swedish national football team with 2–1 in the opening ceremony of Ryavallen (the other team is AIK 1979 with 3–2) and one of only two teams to win Allsvenskan as newcomers in 1961, the other team was Östers IF in 1968. Elfsborg have repeatedly participated for the qualifier to Champions League, Europa League and was as late as 2007 in 2007–08 UEFA Cup and was an overall winner in 2008 UEFA Intertoto Cup the following year.
The club have won six national championships, the latest in 2012, and three national cups.

History

Borås Fotbollslag was formed on 26 June 1904, by a group of youngsters. In 1906 the name was changed to IF Elfsborg, because the founders felt there were too many teams with 'Borås' in their name. In 1926 Elfsborg won Västsvenska Serien, and defeated Halmstad BK in the play off, and was promoted to Allsvenskan for the first time. During the 1930s Elfsborg built a very strong team led by striker Sven Jonasson, who appeared in both the 1934 and 1938 World Cup. In 1936 Elfsborg won Allsvenskan for the first time, and two more titles followed soon after (1939 and 1940). During this period Elfsborg had as many as seven players in the Swedish national team.

The club also fielded a bandy team for decades. In 1920, 1924, 1927, 1932, 1934, and 1938, IF Elfsborg won the Västergötland bandy district championship.

In 1941 Elfsborg left Ramnavallen to play their home games at the newly constructed Ryavallen. The first game at the new ground was supposed to be a friendly between Sweden and Finland, but Finland's involvement in the Second World War prevented them from playing, so they were replaced by Elfsborg, who beat the Swedish national team 2–1.

In the mid-1940s Elfsborg came close to winning Allsvenskan again, but finished second three years in a row. By the late 1940s, Elfsborg's glory days were over, and the club was eventually relegated in 1954.

In 1960 Elfsborg won promotion after an impressive season with 20 wins in 22 games, and the club won Allsvenskan for the fourth time in 1961, becoming the first Swedish team to go straight from the second level to becoming champions. This was under the leadership of the legendary Sven Andreasson as chairman.

In 1977 Elfsborg reached second place, but the following years proved difficult for the club. In 1987 Elfsborg finished last in Allsvenskan, and did not return to the top flight until 1997. The team that won promotion contained several future Swedish internationals including Anders Svensson and Tobias Linderoth. Even though Elfsborg won their first two cup titles (in 2001 and 2003), the club struggled to stay in Allsvenskan in the following years.

In 2005 Elfsborg spent a lot of money on building Borås Arena, and bringing back former players. The investments paid off and the fifth Championship was won in 2006 – the club's first Allsvenskan title for 41 years. The year after Elfsborg appeared in the Champions League qualifying stage for the first time, and subsequently reached the group stage in the UEFA Cup for the first time. On the way there they knocked out Linfield FC (Northern Ireland) and Debreceni VSC (Hungary) in the qualification stage of the Champions League before eventually being eliminated themselves by the hands of Valencia CF (Spain) in the last round. The club won the last round of qualifications for the Uefa Cup against FC Dinamo București (Romania).

In the group stage IF Elfsborg faced AC Fiorentina and Villarreal away and AEK Athens and FK Mladá Boleslav at Borås Arena and was knocked out.

In the following years, IF Elfsborg under the guidance of coach Magnus Haglund and his 4-2-3-1-formation have established themselves as a top club in Swedish football. The clearly stated ambition to finish top 4, qualifying for European football every year. In 2007, the club finished 4th securing a place in the last edition of the Intertoto-cup, from which they advanced but was surprisingly knocked out by St Patrick's Athletic F.C. in the second qualifying round of the UEFA Cup after conceding late goals in both legs.

The team bounced back though, competing for the title again until the very last round of 2008. In the end, injuries to key players like Anders Svensson and Stefan Ishizaki proved to costly, eventually having to settle for second place behind Kalmar FF.

The following year, IF Elfsborg once again challenged for a place in European football, brushing aside Hungarian side Szombathelyi Haladás and Portuguese S.C. Braga before eventually falling in the last qualifying round against S.S. Lazio.

IF Elfsborg were big favourites for winning the 2009 but had problem capitalizing on their high possession and many chances and eventually ended up third behind AIK and rivals IFK Göteborg.

The following year expectations were still high, but due to a mediocre start (only nine points in the first 9 rounds), IF Elfsborgs 2010 campaign increasingly became an uphill struggle trying, but in the end failing to catch up to Helsingborgs IF and Malmö FF. Malmö FF eventually ended up champions with IF Elfsborg in fourth place.

2010 marked IF Elfsborg's fourth consecutive season in continental football. The team entered the Europa League second qualifying round in the seeded pot having no real difficulties eliminating Moldovan side FC Iskra-Stal (on an aggregate score of 3–1). The Macedonian side FK Teteks proved to be no real challenge in the following round with IF Elfsborg effectively seeing of their opponents in an emphatic 5–0 win first leg win.

The team seemed in good shape to make a serious challenge for reaching the Europa League group stage even though they would be unseeded in the last qualifying round. Unfortunately the draw was once again one of the worst possible. SSC Napoli was held to a 1–0 win away at Stadio San Paolo following a stellar effort by new Danish signing Jesper Christiansen, but the Italians proved too strong in the second leg where they cruised to a 2–0 victory, both goals scored by Uruguay international Edinson Cavani.

The 2010 season was a busy year for transfers, both in and out. Sweden international Emir Bajrami making his way to FC Twente during the summer and top goalscorer Denni Avdic moving to Werder Bremen during the January transfer window. Three players were signed from Danish clubs. Former hero Jon Jönsson was brought in from Brøndby IF during the summer to bolster the defense, goalkeeper Jesper Christiansen from FC København and right back Andreas Klarström from Esbjerg fB making a comeback to the club.

The club made some more signings during the 2010–2011 winter. Most notable were forward Lasse Nilsson from Vitesse Arnhem, central defender Andreas Augustsson from Randers FC and target man David Elm from Fulham F.C. Once again, many of the media pundits were thinking that IF Elfsborg were firm favourites to win the 2011.

In early spring former allsvenskan top goalscorer Fredrik Berglund decided to hang up his boots.

The 2011 campaign showed an IF Elfsborg seemingly set on playing a more straightforward counter-attacking game, at least away. This seemed to be a recipe for success since the team started grabbing a few more away wins here and there. after the first half of the season the team was trailing Helsingborgs IF at the top of the table. Young left winger Niklas Hult was the standout player during the first half of the season, quickly establishing himself in the team and being touted by some members of the press as "the new Freddie Ljungberg".

In continental football, IF Elfsborg entered the fray in the first qualifying round of the Europa League. CS Fola Esch were brushed aside after winning 4–0 in the first leg at home and drawing (1–1) away.

Colours and crest

Ever since Elfsborg was established they wore the main colour yellow with some strikes of black. The yellow and black color originates in Älvsborg, and it was Älvsborg Regiment that had yellow and black color on their flag, which meant that Elfsborg of course would play in these colors. So it became yellow shirts and black shorts. The costumes remained pure in the colors yellow and black with no club text scrolling on the chest or back. They were simply pure in their colors, and it remained so until the 1940s when trends over Sweden was to adorn their badge on the shirt. In this manner, they could strengthen their brand even more. For Elfsborgs part it was the classic black text Elfsborg in italics placed on the chest at the heart. From 1940 until 2007, almost 50 years, the classic text Elfsborg decorated chest. From 2007 there was a change to what is now the official club emblem there, an emblem derived from the 1970s and has appeared in several versions at most of Elfsborg sections. It is a crown of yellow and black with Elfsborg engraved in it and a football at the top. The reason for the change was mainly to promote the club brand. They wanted a brand that people and companies could associate themselves with – instead of a text as before.

Elfsborgs reserve kit is red, and become so during a match against the Swedish national football team in 1941. In the beginning it was planned to be a match between the Finland national football team and the Swedish national football team in a celebration to Elfsborgs new arena Ryavallen. But Elfsborg had to replace a war-torn Finland due to the second world war in a match against the Swedish national team. Amazingly enough, Elfsborg won with 2–1 and the story behind the red kit was that Sweden played in yellow which also Elfsborg did, so they had to change colors and red was the only one available on short notice, it was borrowed from Borås Wäferi who had a red and white kit. This eventually became a symbolic color due to the victory for Elfsborg and so it remained as a reserve kit. The colours red and white is also the symbol of the city Borås, their coat of arms is in the colours of red and white with the two sciccors. Elfsborg became with this victory the only team in Allsvenskans history to ever beat the Swedish national football team.

Sponsorship
The shirts remained long without a major sponsor, which would obviously affect the economy. When IFE harrowed in Division 1 South in
the early 1990s, Olle Blomqvist CEO of Ellos went in with large sums of money and saved the association by becoming the major sponsor. This was not necessarily because he is particularly interested in football, but because he knew the importance Elfsborg had to Borås and Sjuhärad. Ellos became such a strong sponsor that people jokingly began to Christen the team "Ellos" due to its presence on their shirts. In 2010, a survey showed that Elfsborg was second best team in Allsvenskan to acquire sponsorship money and to establish and maintain contact with their sponsor. The same year, Elfsborg broke a record in local sponsorships around Sjuhärad when its sponsor money increased from 28 to 33 million SEK.

It was not until recently that they signed a contract with major sportbrands. Elfsborg have significantly signed a contract with Umbro up to this date to use their collection of both soccer shoes and clothes. So strong was Umbro's sponsorship, that a section of Borås Arena became "umbrocorner". In earlier years, teams always sewed their own shirts, but with a contract from a major label, new shirts get released into the market each year– which is an economical advantage.

Stadiums

Ramnavallen
One of the first homegrounds to Elfsborg was a small pitch of grass in Folkparken (Ramnaparken today). However Elfsborg noticed quickly that it required more space to be on, both for training and matches. They went to Fristad and Fristads hed where they practiced and played, due to the more space. Next ground that was in Borås was Apotekarnas Mosse who would later become today's Ramnavallen.

Ramnavallen was completed in 1922 and then got Elfsborg finally run out on his long-awaited stadium, Ramnavallen. At its time, this was a very modern stadium even though it initially took only 2.700 spectators. Borås Tidning was lyrical about the contribution and described the stadium as impressive from the provincial point of view and because it had high international standards. Elfsborg first Allsvenskan league match on Ramnavallen was played in 1926 and guests were Örgryte IS. 3887 spectators came and saw Evert Lundqvist make the only goal for the guests. The next season became the first yellow and black premiere triumph on the new stadium. AIK came to Ramnavallen and were defeated with 2–1.

Elfsborg kept ramnavallen as a homeground until 1941 and during this time won three league titles. Attendance record of ramnavallen was against AIK 7 June 1936, the end game before the league gold, 16.348 spectators came to see Elfsborg win their first league title in history.

Ryavallen

Ryavallen was completed in 1941 and became first of all the new homeground of IF Elfsborg. But it was also Borås first major sports stadium, where the usual track and field could be exercised. Hence the athletics track along the pitch. Before one grandstand was demolished in 2005 the capacity was 19.400, to today's approximately 7,000. The old Ryavallen in Borås will get a facelift in 2012. Prior to Swedish Athletics Championship 2013, the current six running tracks widened to eight, and both seat grandstand and the earthworks plan is stripped to make room. The old legendary dikes on Ryavallen gets a proper scratch when Ryavallen upgraded for 13 million SEK. After the renovation, Ryavallen will not be approved to play football on by Swedish Football Association nor UEFA, it will in the future only be used for the purpose of athletics.

At one point came ryavallen to be used for a championship. During the 1958 FIFA World Cup, it hosted the matches between USSR and Austria, and between England and Austria. The Soviet Union won their match against Austria with 2–0, and England had a draw against Austria, 2–2. A championship where Sweden came as a surprise to the finals where they faced Brazil. It ended with a 5–2 loss, but an honorable second place which is the best Sweden performed in a World Cup.

The most memorable event in Ryavallen was the gold game against Örgryte IS – 1961. Elfsborg faced Örgryte on Ryavallen and plays 1–1. When the final whistle sounded, it was clear that Elfsborg as first team come up from Division 2 and immediately won Allsvenskan gold. This made them historic. This was the fourth league gold for Elfsborg. Another very memorable moment of the more terrible degree was when the grandstand collapsed against IFK Göteborg – 1979. The reason was because of the high spectator pressure (19,170) the grandstand collapsed and 10 people had to get to hospital. A memorable moment of the weirder degree was an own goal by Husqvarna IF in the final minutes – 1958. Elfsborg played against Husqvarna IF and it is 0–1 with ten minutes left. A Husqvarna player receives the ball just outside his own penalty area. He then shoots, hard and accurate an untakeable shot into his own goal. No one understands why, and the match ends 1–1. In the newspaper the day after he explains that he was so tired that he did not know which side of the pitch he had found himself.

25 October 2004 would be a historic game before kickoff. Elfsborg met Hammarby and that was the last game ever at Ryavallen. The arena had become too old after 63 years of service. In 2005 Elfsborg moved to its new modern arena, Borås Arena, and ryavallen was converted completely to only fit for athletics. Even so, did Ryavallen reach the highest attendance record in history of Elfsborg, IF Elfsborg – IFK Norrköping – 1961. Record Audience 21,854 in this historic match. Elfsborg won the match with 3–0. After Ryavallen inaugurated in 1941 by Crown Prince Gustav Adolf V and Elfsborg struck as the only Allsvenskan team in the history Sweden national football team in the inaugural match by 2–1. That also completed a 63-year history in the last match against Hammarby with a win.

Borås Arena

Borås Arena is a football stadium in Borås, Sweden. It is the home ground of IF Elfsborg and Norrby IF and was opened on 17 April 2005. Borås Arena has an artificial turf pitch, and was changed to the most modern synthetic turf on the market during the UEFA Euro 2012 at a cost of £500 000. The capacity of the arena is 14,500–17,800 depending on usage, 14,800 is mostly the capacity during international matches, because Uefa would not approve the installation of seats on the standing because of fire risk which means a lower capacity is needed to be approved by Uefa. Borås Arena is located next to Elfsborgs old homeground Ryavallen, both of the stadiums are built together at the roofs, which means that the new stadium is still attached to the old historical Ryavallen.

The first construction started on 31 December 2003 and was inaugurated 17 April 2005 at a cost of £1,120 000 . Which was very cheap at this time considering to be Sweden's most modern stadium at that time. It was an effort by Borås Municipality that went out as a lender to Elfsborg. A necessary investment for the club and the city, Elfsborg would own their own stadium by the company Borås Arena AB and would receive all revenues without any intermediaries from matches. Borås Arena didn't only open a new era for IF Elfsborg but also for other clubs in Allsvenskan, Elfsborg was the first club to build a new arena owned by their own investment company. Many other clubs have built new arenas copying the model Elfsborg set up, trying to own their arena which gives big economic resources. Borås Arena consists of four main grandstands; Knallelandsläktaren, Ålgårdsläktaren, Sjuhäradsläktaren and Elfsborgsläktaren.

The first game at Borås Arena was between IF Elfsborg vs Örgryte IS on 17 April 2005 in the top Swedish league, Allsvenskan. The game ended in a 1–0 victory for Elfsborg, Daniel Mobaeck scoring the only and first goal in history on Borås Arena. The current record attendance is 17,070 and was set 4 July 2005 in a game between IF Elfsborg and Kalmar FF which marked the return of both Anders Svensson and Mathias Svensson. Anders Svensson also became the first on Borås Arena to score a hat-trick in the derby against rivals IFK Göteborg, Elfsborg won with Anders 3 goals, 3–1. The highest attendance on an international tournament was during the Champions League play-off against Valencia CF where 13,148 spectators came to see Elfsborg deal with the Spaniards. Elfsborg lost with 2–1, after a goal by Daniel Alexandersson.

The stadium was originally scheduled to be a tournament site for the 2009 UEFA European Under-21 Football Championship, but a sponsorship conflict with Max fast food chain's location at the stadium and official UEFA sponsor McDonald's, plus a contractual requirement for official sponsors to have a monopoly over the stadium's area, and a refusal to close the restaurant led to it losing its status as a site for the tournament. A strange conflict that led to Elfsborg and Borås Arena lost the championship as an arranger.

2006 was the highlight in Borås Arenas young history. The year when Elfsborg received dividends on their great effort by salvaging the club's 5th SM-Gold. An explicit goal from the club was to win SM-Gold by 2007 and this was accomplished a year in advance, 5 November 2006. The association was strengthened at all levels for a couple of years, not least organizationally and financially, with new sports director "Mr. Elfsborg" Stefan Andreasson, President-elect Bosse "Bank" Johansson and two billionaires as external funders. The new highly skilled (and young) manager couple Magnus Haglund and Peter Wettergren, who was employed before the 2004 season, was also of course in the club's big bet. The following year (2005) was also "Elfsborg Fortress", Borås Arena, completed while enlisted old heroes in the form of Anders and Mathias Svensson came back. Memorable matches this season on Borås Arena was at home the victory against Malmö FF (4–2), which many described as the best in the season and where Anders Svensson made the team's single best effort during the season. Another memorable match was the last and crucial one. Gold match at a packed Borås Arena against Djurgårdens IF where Joakim Sjöhage became gold shooter with the only goal which meant that over 40 years of waiting was over for the Elfsborgs fans.

Supporters

Already in the 1940s there was the legendary Elfsborg chant "heja di våra, inte di dära, trampa di främmatta pöjka på tära" on Ryavallen, at the time, including of a certain young Ingvar Carlsson, who later became prime minister. For a few years in the 1970s "Di Gule" played fantastic football and was in top contest of the Swedish Allsvenskan. At this time the British supporter culture retrieved from "Tipsextra" began to interfere and influence in Swedish football culture, with an impact even on Ryavallen in Borås, where the seating stand for many years was the busiest around Ryavallen and Elfsborg. A young supporter section was formed later on within Elfsborgs fanclub and the culture of being on the standing ground began to arise all along with the contemporary characteristic hat and striped scarf in Elfsborgs colours yellow and black. In the coming years, there was a small and disorganized supporter group who failed to make a big fuss.

Guliganerna
1991 underwent IF Elfsborg the club's probably heaviest period ever, the economy and the results weighted during the period in Söderettan. 21 November 1991, however, formed a collection of young men, a supporter compound that would become a familiar concept not only in Borås, but throughout Sweden: Guliganerna. Despite continued play in Söderettan and low public interest in all of Sweden the supporter group, Guliganerna, continued to grow. 1990s guliganer became not known for their quantity but for their faithfulness, to always be there wherever IF Elfsborg played. After the fan bus arrived late for an away game at some point in the mid-1990s, the players looked nervous on the stand and was worried that something happened, after this incident the players had the supporters promise to not be late for the games so as not to disturb the players focus.

In 1997, was IF Elfsborg back in the top tier of Swedish football and that also meant an upturn for Guliganerna, in −97 was the first Elfsborg Tifo group founded, TGD (Tifosi Guligan Divisione), who had a few tifos before the members quit for various reasons in 1999, mainly because they had no financial backing. Year 2000 became the starting year of the great generation change that occurred in Elfsborgs supporterlines until now, a group of young boys founded the current tifo group, GTS (Guligan Tifo Support), and a more youthful profile became clear among Elfsborgs supporter sections.

2006 was 45-years of waiting over. The club had won national championship which also meant an increased interest around Elfsborg. In 2011 Guliganerna had their 20th anniversary celebrated, the tribute was made in connection with the game against Kalmar FF, the players wore specially made anniversary T-shirts and GTS arranged the most expensive tifo ever in the history of the club. Guliganerna also broke during the same year, a new member record of 1155 people, making Guliganerna Sweden fifth largest fan base in the 2011.

Elfsborgs main antagonist and rivalry is pointed against IFK Göteborg and has been so since all the way back in the 1920s. The geographical position between the cities makes it Elfsborgs only and closest derby also called "El Västico", which also reflects the attendance figures since it is almost always sold out in these games. Guliganerna and Peking Fanz (supporters of IFK Norrköping) however has a completely own history among Swedish supporters, a history that stands as a thorn in the eyes of other supporter organizations in Sweden. This friendship is based on that Guliganerna in the 1990s invited visiting supporters before the match, Peking Fanz invited back several times and the friendship was born. Since this friendship was born, both supporter bases now often follow each other's games, which makes Guliganerna and Peking Fanz unique. Especially between Elfsborgs only ultras group Yellow Fanatics, there are strong links with the IFK Norrköping, Peking ultras.

European record

1960–1980, playing in the UEFA Intertoto Cup and UEFA Cup 

Elfsborgs advancement in European football began in 1961 after winning national championship the same year they qualified to the current UEFA Intertoto Cup. Elfsborg first resistance ever in a European Cup was against the German SC Tasmania 1900 Berlin, which they won with 2–3 away and the stunning 5–2 at home. The second match was against the classic Swiss team FC Basel, which began with a 1–2 loss at home but Elfsborg gathered forces and won in the returning game with 3–6 after a hat-trick by the fantastic player Henry Larsson. The last and final match was against the difficult beaten Sparta Rotterdam who hade before meeting with Elfsborg not lost a single game, the Dutch proved to be too difficult, it ended in a 2–5 loss at home and 4–3 away loss. But despite the loss Elfsborg ended as runners-up being the second team in the group and the tournament's big winner was Henry Larsson with his 8 goals and Lars Råberg with 6 his goals. Five years later, in 1966, continued Elfsborg adventures in Europe and the UEFA Intertoto Cup. The first opponent stood the German Borussia Neunkirchen for, a match which Elfsborg won both home and away with a total of 4–1. The second match against VSS Košice became a very different story, they lost 3–0 away and then crushed the opponents with 6–0 at home, after a hat-trick by Roger Carlsson. In the final group stage match against leaders Vorwärts Berlin was lost with 2–0 in both matches which meant that Elfsborg finally ended as third in the group.

Also the following year 1967 played Elfsborg in the UEFA Intertoto Cup where they in the first group stage match met the germans Werder Bremen. The first match ended in a 4–1 loss away, but the second game ended with a draw 2–2 at home. In the second game stood the Polish team Polonia Bytom for, where Elfsborg lost in both matches. But in the last match against the Swiss Grasshopper Club Zürich Elfsborg would take a memorable scalp, when they beat them at home with 5–2 after a hat-trick by Lars Heinemann. The return ended in a 3–1 loss and Elfsborg finished again in third place in the group. 1971 was a bad year out in Europe for Elfsborg, they met the teams Stal Mielec, Tatran Prešov and Vejle BK. They lost every game except against the Danish Vejle BK where they won both games with a total of 8–0, and once again Elfsborg ended as third in their group. The year after 1972 played Elfsborg in the UEFA Cup for the first time against the classic German champions Hertha Berlin in the first round, they lost with 3–1 at Olympic Stadium and with 1–4 at home.

1975 was Elfsborg worst year in European competition and the UEFA Intertoto Cup when they finished last in the group after you have met teams as Baník Ostrava, Celik Zenica and Vitoria Setúbal. Elfsborg still won at home against Baník Ostrava with 3–1 at home and a tie against Vitoria Setúbal. In 1978, Elfsborg participated once again in the UEFA Intertoto Cup and this year was slightly better than the last in 1975, Elfsborg won with a total of 5–3 against Norwegian Lillestrøm SK, and then a win against former Yugoslav Sloboda Tuzla. But against the giant Israeli Maccabi Netanya F.C. Elfsborg could not compete with, and lost the first game with 7–1 away but managed with a draw at home, 2–2. In 1978 was Elfsborg in the UEFA Cup for the second time when they stood against the French sovereigns RC Strasbourg. The first meeting won Elfsborg surprisingly with 2–0 at home, but in the returning game they lost with 4–1 in front of 31 000 spectators.

1980–2000, many years outside European football
1980, became Elfsborg best year ever in the UEFA Intertoto Cup when they won their group and became the winner of the tournament. This after they first won against FK Napredak Kruševac with a total of 4–2 and then against Slavia Sofia with a total of 3–1. German VfL Bochum became more difficult when the loss in the first meeting with 2–1 and then changed with a win at home 1–0, this meant that Elfsborg ended up as number one in their group. The following year, 1981, did Elfsborg participate in the UEFA Cup where they faced Scottish St Mirren F.C. The first match ended in a 1–2 loss at home who then followed up with a draw 0–0 in Scotland. 1983 Elfsborg would make their penultimate appearance in the UEFA Intertoto Cup, when they stood against the teams TJ Vitkovice, Trakia Plovdiv and Eintracht Braunschweig. It was a bad adventure where they only won against German Eintracht Braunschweig with 1–0 at home and play a draw against Trakia Plovdiv, this meant that Elfsborg finished as last in their group. Despite the poor performance 1983, they reached the UEFA Cup, 1984, where the opponents was Polish team Widzew Łódź, before 30 000 spectators played Elfsborg a draw away against the Poles, 0–0, also at home playing a heroic game with a draw 2–2 and but the Poles advanced furthermore, after more away goals.

2000–present
It would take almost 20 years before Elfsborg would participate in the European cups again, after the heaviest period in the club's history Elfsborg was now back at the top layer of Allsvenskan and participated in the UEFA Cup in 2001 after they won the national cup. They stood against JK Trans Narva in the first round, where they won with 1–3 away and then also won with 5–0 at home after a hat-trick by Stefan Andreasson. The second round was against one of the Polish giants Legia Warsaw where Elfsborg lost with a total of 10–2. After winning national cup once again, Elfsborg participated in the UEFA Cup in 2004 where the opponents in the first round was Glentoran F.C. who were beaten with a total of 3–1, in the next round Elfsborg stood against Croatian team NK Dinamo Zagreb, Elfsborg lost the first game away with 2–0 and then played a draw at home 0–0. After winning national championship in 2006 got Elfsborg for the first time participate in the UEFA Champions League. This occurred in 2007 when the first round was against Linfield FC where Elfsborg in the first match played a draw 0–0. To then win at home with 1–0 after a goal by Mathias Svensson. The second round was against Hungarian Debreceni VSC where they won away with 1–0 after a goal by Daniel Mobaeck. They secured promotion to the third round by playing 0–0 at home. The third round was against Spanish giants Valencia CF, where 50 000 spectators at the Mestalla Stadium saw Elfsborg lose with 3–0 after including goal by David Silva. Back at Borås Arena Elfsborg lost again with 2–1 after goals by Daniel Alexandersson and David Villa with Valencia's decisive 2–1 goal.

After the excellent results in the UEFA Champions League became Elfsborg directly qualified for the 2007–08 UEFA Cup group stage where they stood against the teams FC Dinamo București, AEK Athens, ACF Fiorentina, FK Mladá Boleslav and Villarreal CF. Elfsborg won against FC Dinamo București with 2–1 and a draw against AEK Athens, 1–1. The following year 2008 achieved Elfsborg for the last time winning the UEFA Intertoto Cup by beating teams HB Tórshavn with a total of 2–1, Hibernian FC with a total of 4–0 and FK Riga with a total of 1–0. Which meant that they finished as group winners. That same year they also played UEFA Cup last time 2008–09 UEFA Cup when it was against the Irish St Patrick's Athletic F.C. but lost surprisingly with a total of 4–3. In 2009 Elfsborg started for the first time playing in the UEFA Europa League where they in the second round stood against Szombathelyi Haladás as they were defeated with a total of 3–0. In the third round was against Portuguese 2010–11 UEFA Europa League finalists S.C. Braga, as they beat them after a completely win by a total of 4–1. In the final play-off round Elfsborg stood against classic S.S. Lazio where they in the first meeting lost with 3–0 and then again after a heroic effort won with 1–0 after a goal by Denni Avdic.

Also the year after 2010 played Elfsborg in the UEFA Europa League where they stood against FC Iskra-Stal in the second round and won with the total of 3–1. The third round was against FK Teteks from Macedonia, a team that Elfsborg won easily against with a total of 7–1. The play-off round was once again against one of the classic Italian teams against Maradona's old club SSC Napoli. Elfsborg succeeded after a heroic performance by goalkeeper Jesper Christiansen to get away from the Stadio San Paolo with a 1–0 loss. Back at the Borås Arena Elfsborg lost anyway with 2–0 after two goals by Edinson Cavani who got his big breakthrough in this match. In 2011 Elfsborg played in the UEFA Europa League for the third consecutive year, and stood against CS Fola Esch in the first round which they won with a total of 5–1. The second round was against FK Suduva where they won easily with a total of 4–1. But in the third round Elfsborg lost surprisingly against the Norwegian Aalesunds FK with a total of 5–1 and failed to reach the play-offs. The same thing happened the year after in 2012. Even if Elfsborg had a perfect start in the qualification by winning a home game in the first stage against Floriana F.C. with 8–0, the biggest international victory in Elfsborgs history. The away game was just as easy, Elfsborg won with 5–0 and with a total of 13–0. In the second stage were the opponents FC Dacia Chişinău and Elfsborg lost the first game after a weak effort with 1–0. But won easy at Borås Arena with 2–0 and therefore advanced to the third stage. In the third stage it would be a Scandinavian battle, since the opponents were Danish AC Horsens. The first away game ended with a draw, 1–1, after Horsens received a penalty in stoppage time. But in their home game Elfsborg lost 2–3 and history was repeated from the previous year, Elfsborg failed once again to reach the play-offs.

European statistics
(As of 22 June 2015)

A = appearances, GP = games played, W = won, D = drawn, L = lost, GF = goals for, GA = goals against.

Matches
(As of 26 August 2021)
 Q = qualification round
 R = round
 Group = group stage
 (a) = away goals rule

Rankings

UEFA club coefficient ranking

Players

First-team squad

Out on loan

Notable players

This list of notable players includes those who received international caps for the Sweden national football team, made significant contributions to the team in terms of appearances or goals while playing for the team, or who made significant contributions to the sport either before they played for the team, or after they left.

The players are all listed according to when they debuted for IF Elfsborg:
List criteria:
 Player has made more than 250 Allsvenskan league appearances for the club.
 Player has scored more than 50 Allsvenskan league goals for the club.
 Player has received more than 70 caps for the Sweden national team.
 Player included in the Swedish football Hall of Fame.

Club officials

Organisation
.

Technical staff
.

Youth section

.

Managerial history

Listed according to when they became managers for IF Elfsborg:
(C) – Caretaker
(FTC) – First-team coach

Notable managers

The managers are listed according to when they were first appointed manager for IF Elfsborg:

List criteria:
 Won at least one major honour with IF Elfsborg.
 Managed the team for at least 5 years.

Honours

Domestic 

Swedish Champions:
 Winners (6): 1935–36, 1938–39, 1939–40, 1961, 2006, 2012

League

Allsvenskan:
Winners (6): 1935–36, 1938–39, 1939–40, 1961, 2006, 2012
Runners-up (7): 1942–43, 1943–44, 1944–45, 1965, 1977, 2008, 2020
Division 1 Södra:
 Winners: 1996
Runners-up: 1991
Division 2 Götaland:
 Winners: 1960
Runners-up (4): 1955–56, 1956–57, 1957–58, 1959
Division 2 Västsvenska Serien:
 Winners: 1925–26
Runners-up: 1914–15, 1923–24

Cups

Svenska Cupen:
Winners (3): 2000–01, 2003, 2013–14
Runners-up (3): 1942, 1980–81, 1996–97
Svenska Supercupen:
Winners: 2007
Runners-up: 2014

European
UEFA Intertoto Cup:
 Winners: 1980, 2008 (joint winner)
 Runners-up: 1961

Records

In the 2013 Elfsborg played their 70th season in Allsvenskan from its inception in 1924 up to and including the 2013 season. This placing them on a 5th place of those teams who have participated in total seasons. They have also played top-flight football continually in Sweden since 1997, which currently is the 3rd longest top-flight tenure of any club in Sweden—the longest one is IFK Göteborg, since 1977.

The club is currently placed 5th in the all-time Allsvenskan table, "maratontabellen" in Swedish, which is a cumulative record of all match results, points, and goals of every team that has played in Allsvenskan since its inception in 1924–25. Furthermore, Elfsborg is placed 6th in the all-time medal table, with a total of 24 medals of different value – the most recent was received in 2012.

The player in IF Elfsborg who holds most club and national records is Sven Jonasson. In 409 games, most appearances ever in Elfsborg, he scored a total of 252 goals in Allsvenskan, which makes it an all-time record. He played in Elfsborg throughout his career, which started in 1927 and ended 1947, a total of 20 years. What's more, the most remarkable achievement is his unbreakable record of 344 games in consecutive. A record that was broken in a most unfortunate way, he missed his first game in 14 years because of failure to receive furlough during his military service. He was also the first goalscorer ever for the Sweden national football team in a worldcup. It was in the 1934 FIFA World Cup, where he scored two goals in Sweden's 3–2 victory against Argentina.

 Most appearances, total: 409,  Sven Jonasson
 Most goals scored, total: 252,  Sven Jonasson*
 Most appearances in Sweden while playing for Elfsborg, total: 106,  Anders Svensson*
 Most consecutive games, total: 344,  Sven Jonasson, 1927–41*
 Biggest victory, Svenska cupen: 19–0 vs. Varbergs BoIS, 21 January 1996*
 Biggest defeat, Allsvenskan: 0–7 vs. GAIS, 25 August 1926
 Home victory, Allsvenskan: 10–1 vs. Degerfors IF, 28 August 1938
 Away victory, Allsvenskan: 12–2 vs. IFK Eskilstuna, 19 April 1936*
 International victory, UEFA Europa League: 8–0 vs. Floriana F.C., 5 July 2012*
 Highest attendance, Ryavallen: 22,654 vs. IFK Norrköping, 1961
 Highest attendance, Borås Arena: 17,070 vs. Kalmar FF, 4 July 2005
 Highest attendance, Ramnavallen: 16,340 vs. AIK, 7 June 1936
 Highest average attendance, season 1961: 14,608
 Highest away attendance, Ullevi: 48 296 vs. IFK Göteborg, 2 June 1977

 Allsvenskan all-time record.

Team records
IF Elfsborg top ten most goal scorers and appearances.

Most goals
League, Allsvenskan

Most Appearances
League, Allsvenskan

Footnotes

References

Literature
75 år med Elfsborg, Arne Gullberg, 1979
Jubileumsskrift Elfsborg 90 år, Mats Segerblom, 1994
1961 – guldåret, Mikael Häggström, 2001
ETTHUNDRA, Arne Gullberg mfl, 2004
Utmanarna – Så ska Elfsborg vinna SM-guld, Henrik Ystén, 2006
Guldknallen – IF Elfsborg guldlaget, Aftonbladet, 2006
Guldregn över Borås, Borås Tidning, 2006
Stå upp för Elfsborg, Per Samuelson, 2007
IF Elfsborg – en kramgo knalle, Mikael Hjerpe, Idrottsörlaget i Västerås AB, 2010
Guldbilagan, Borås Tidning, 2012

External links

Official websites
 
 Allsvenskan – Elfsborg at the Allsvenskan official site
 Uefa – Elfsborg at the Uefa official site

 
Allsvenskan clubs
Football clubs in Västra Götaland County
Association football clubs established in 1904
Bandy clubs established in 1904
1904 establishments in Sweden
Sport in Borås
Svenska Cupen winners